Nuthalapati Joseph was an Indian politician. He was a Member of Parliament, representing Andhra Pradesh in the Rajya Sabha the upper house of India's Parliament as a member of the Indian National Congress.

References

Rajya Sabha members from Andhra Pradesh
Indian National Congress politicians
Year of birth missing
1992 deaths
Indian National Congress politicians from Andhra Pradesh